The Trevor Barker Award is an Australian rules football award for the player voted the St Kilda Football Club best and fairest player during the home and away season in the Australian Football League by a voting panel.

The St Kilda Best & Fairest Award was first inaugurated in 1914. It was re-named the Trevor Barker Award in the 1990's, in honour of St Kilda Hall of Fame Legend, Australian Football Hall of Fame Inductee, Club Captain, dual Best & Fairest Winner and Reserves Coach, Trevor Barker, who died in 1996 aged 39.

Nick Riewoldt has won the most awards with six between 2002 and 2014.

The voting system as of the 2017 AFL season, consists of five coaches giving players a ranking from one to four after each match. Players can receive a maximum of 20 votes for a game.

The winning player receives a smaller replica of the main trophy each season, along with medals awarded for the players who finish  in the top three. The awards name is also the name of the St Kilda Football Club's main player awards event, held at the conclusion of each season. The ceremony also includes the Robert Harvey Best Clubman Award, the Lenny Hayes Crest Player Award, the Best Emerging Player Award, and the publicly voted Sainter of the Year award.

Recipients

Multiple winners

References 
General

Specific

Australian Football League awards
St Kilda Football Club
Awards established in 1914
Australian rules football-related lists